Conus thalassiarchus, common name the bough cone, is a species of sea snail, a marine gastropod mollusk in the family Conidae, the cone snails and their allies.

Like all species within the genus Conus, these snails are predatory and venomous. They are capable of "stinging" humans, therefore live ones should be handled carefully or not at all.

Description
The size of the shell varies between 35 mm and 115 mm. The spire is depressed and nearly smooth, with a sharp angle. The color of the shell is white, longitudinally and angularly reticulated with chestnut lines, chocolate-tinted at the base. It shows sometimes an irregular central white band covered by revolving lines of spots, and occasionally with yellowish bands above and below the latter and similarly spotted.

Distribution
This marine species occurs off the Southern Philippines.

References

 Jousseaume, F., 1899. Description de coquilles nouvelles. Le Naturaliste 13(2): 91
 Röckel, D., Korn, W. & Kohn, A.J., 1995. Manual of the living Conidae. Volume 1: Indo-Pacific region. Hemmen: 517 pp

External links
 The Conus Biodiversity website
 Cone Shells – Knights of the Sea
 
 Syntype in MNHN, Paris

thalassiarchus
Gastropods described in 1834